Eucalyptus burgessiana, commonly known as the Faulconbridge mallee ash, is a small tree or mallee that is endemic to New South Wales. It has smooth bark, narrow lance-shaped or curved adult leaves, flower buds arranged in groups of between seven and eleven, white flowers and barrel-shaped or cup-shaped flowers.

Description
It has smooth grey, pink, orange, pale brown or grey bark. Young plants and coppice regrowth are densely warty on the lower stem and have leaves that are glossy and bright green on both sides. Flowering mainly occurs between August and December and the flowers are white.

Taxonomy and naming
Eucalyptus burgessiana was first formally described in 1972 by Lawrie Johnson and Donald Blaxell from a specimen in Faulconbridge. The description was published in Contributions from the New South Wales National Herbarium. The specific epithet (burgessiana) honours Colin Burgess (1907–1987) who was knowledgeable about the flora of the Blue Mountains.

Distribution and habitat
Faulconbridge mallee ash grows in mallee shrubland between Springwood, Faulconbridge and Jervis Bay.

References

 A Field Guide to Eucalypts - Brooker & Kleinig volume 1,  page 99

burgessiana
Myrtales of Australia
Flora of New South Wales
Trees of Australia
Mallees (habit)
Plants described in 1972
Taxa named by Lawrence Alexander Sidney Johnson